Dobrichka municipality or Dobrich rural municipality (Добрич-селска) is a municipality in Dobrich Province, Northeastern Bulgaria, located in Southern Dobruja geographical region. It lies in the central southern part of the province and is not to be confused with Dobrich municipality (equivalent to the town of Dobrich), which is an enclave within Dobrichka.

Although the city is not part of the municipality, the administration is headquartered in Dobrich.

Settlements 

Dobrichka municipality includes the following 68 villages:

 Altsek
 Batovo
 Bdintsi
 Benkovski
 Bogdan
 Bozhurovo
 Branishte
 Cherna
 Debrene
 Dobrevo
 Dolina
 Donchevo
 Draganovo
 Dryanovets
 Enevo
 Feldfebel Dyankovo
 General Kolevo
 Geshanovo
 Hitovo
 Kamen
 Karapelit
 Kotlentsi
 Kozloduytsi
 Kragulevo
 Lomnitsa
 Lovchantsi
 Lyaskovo
 Malka Smolnitsa
 Medovo
 Metodievo
 Miladinovtsi
 Novo Botevo
 Odartsi
 Odrintsi
 Opanets
 Orlova mogila
 Ovcharovo
 Paskalevo
 Pchelino
 Pchelnik
 Plachi Dol
 Pobeda
 Podslon
 Polkovnik Ivanovo
 Polkovnik Minkovo
 Polkovnik Sveshtarovo
 Popgrigorovo
 Prilep
 Primortsi
 Rosenovo
 Samuilovo
 Svoboda
 Slaveevo
 Sliventsi
 Smolnitsa
 Sokolnik
 Stefan Karadzha
 Stefanovo
 Stozher
 Tsarevets
 Tyanevo
 Vedrina
 Vladimirovo
 Vodnyantsi
 Vrachantsi
 Vratarite
 Zhitnitsa
 Zlatia

Demography 
The following table shows the change of the population during the last two decades. Dobrichka Municipality was separated from Dobrich Municipality in 1987.

Religion 
According to the latest Bulgarian census of 2011, the religious composition, among those who answered the optional question on religious identification, was the following:

See also
Provinces of Bulgaria
Municipalities of Bulgaria
List of cities and towns in Bulgaria

References

External links
 Dobrichka municipality website 

Municipalities in Dobrich Province